The abbreviation Haw. may refer to:

 Adrian Hardy Haworth (1767–1833), entomologist and biologist
 Hawaii, in legal citations
 Supreme Court of Hawaii

See also 

 Haw (disambiguation)